The 1999 Speedway World Team Cup was the 40th edition of the FIM Speedway World Team Cup to determine the team world champions.

The final took place at Pardubice in the Czech Republic. The winners were the Australia team who claimed their second title and first since winning the 1976 Speedway World Team Cup.

Preliminary round

Venue : Veenord, Holland

Holland, Austria and Croatia to Quarter-Final

Quarter-final

Venue : Lonigo, Italy

Australia to Semi-Final

Venue : Abensberg, Germany

Germany to Semi-Final

Semi-final

Venue : Poole, England

Great Britain to World Final

Venue : Leszno, Poland

Australia to World Final

World final

Venue : Pardubice, Czech Republic

Australia  win Championship.  United States third after Sam Ermolenko beat Joe Screen in a race off.

See also
 1999 Speedway Grand Prix

References

1999
World T